The 2016 Vermont gubernatorial election took place on November 8, 2016, and elected the governor of Vermont, concurrently with the 2016 U.S. presidential election, as well as elections to the United States Senate in other states and elections to the United States House of Representatives and various state and local elections.

Incumbent Democratic Governor Peter Shumlin was eligible to run for re-election to a fourth term in office, but opted to retire instead.

The primaries were held on August 9. Former Vermont Agency of Transportation Secretary Sue Minter won the Democratic nomination, and Lieutenant Governor Phil Scott won the  Republican primary, with Scott defeating Minter in the general election. This was the first gubernatorial election in Vermont in which the winner was of a different party than the incumbent president since 1992.

Background
Two-term Democratic Governor Peter Shumlin ran for re-election in 2014 and was widely expected to win easily. However, he only took a plurality of the vote, 46.36%, to Republican Scott Milne's 45.1%, and thus the result was decided by the Vermont General Assembly. The Assembly picked Shumlin by 110 votes to 69. Shumlin announced in June 2015 that he would not run for a fourth term.

Vermont and New Hampshire are the only states in the country whose governors are elected every two years.

Democratic primary

In August, Vermont House Speaker Shap Smith announced that he would be a candidate, but ended his candidacy in November 2015, after his wife was diagnosed with breast cancer. In September, Matt Dunne announced that he would also be a candidate.  Also in September, former state legislator Sue Minter, then serving as Vermont's Secretary of Transportation, announced that she would resign her position in order to join the Democratic race. Former Ambassador Peter Galbraith announced his candidacy in March 2016.

In July, H. Brook Paige was excluded from official Democratic Party events after making derogatory comments on social media.

Minter won the nomination decisively, and was endorsed by Dunne but not Galbraith.

Candidates

Declared
 Matt Dunne, former state senator, Google executive, and candidate for governor in 2010
 Cris Ericson, perennial candidate (also running for the U.S. Senate)
 Peter W. Galbraith, former state senator and former United States Ambassador to Croatia
 Sue Minter, former secretary of the Vermont Agency of Transportation and former state representative
 H. Brooke Paige, former CEO of Remington News Service, candidate for Governor and Attorney General in 2014 and Republican candidate for the U.S. Senate in 2012 (also ran for Attorney General)

Withdrawn
 Shap Smith, Speaker of the Vermont House of Representatives (running for Lieutenant Governor)

Declined
 T.J. Donovan, Chittenden County state's attorney and candidate for Vermont Attorney General in 2012 (running for Vermont Attorney General)
 Deborah Markowitz, secretary of the Vermont Agency of Natural Resources, former Secretary of State of Vermont and candidate for governor in 2010
 Doug Racine, former secretary of the Vermont Agency of Human Services, former lieutenant governor, nominee for governor in 2002 and candidate for governor in 2010
 Peter Shumlin, incumbent governor
 Peter Welch, U.S. Representative and nominee for governor in 1990

Endorsements

Polling

Results

Republican primary
In September 2015, Lieutenant Governor Phil Scott entered the race, and 2014 gubernatorial nominee Scott Milne, who had been considering running, endorsed Scott. In October 2015, retired Wall Street executive Bruce Lisman officially announced his "outsider" candidacy.

Scott was endorsed by most active Vermont Republican politicians, and held a strong lead in a February poll. Lisman's campaign criticized Scott for being too closely connected to outgoing Democratic governor Peter Shumlin and for "plagiarizing" Lisman's ideas, and linked Scott to the "failures" of the Vermont Health Connect insurance platform and the school redistricting Act 46; the candidates' campaigns disagreed over whether this constituted "negative campaigning," and Scott's campaign said the attacks were "patently false".

Scott won the nomination by a large margin.

Candidates

Declared
 Bruce Lisman, retired Wall Street executive
 Phil Scott, Lieutenant Governor

Declined
 Randy Brock, former state senator, former Vermont Auditor of Accounts and nominee for governor in 2012 (running for lieutenant governor)

Endorsements

On May 6, 2016, Scott received the endorsements of all Vermont Republican legislators (listed above) except State Representatives Donald Turner, Doug Gage, Mary Morrissey, Job Tate, and Paul Dame. Among those five legislators who did not endorse Scott, four said they always remain neutral in a party primary election, and one was waiting until after the filing deadline to make an endorsement.

Polling

Results

Liberty Union primary

Candidates

Declared
 Bill "Spaceman" Lee, former Major League Baseball pitcher and Rhinoceros Party presidential candidate in 1988

Results

General election

Debates
Complete video of debate, October 6, 2016 - C-SPAN

Predictions

Polling
{| class="wikitable"
|- valign= bottom
! style="width:215px;"| Poll source
! style="width:215px;"| Date(s)administered
! class=small | Samplesize
! Margin oferror
! style="width:100px;"| SueMinter (D)
! style="width:100px;"| PhilScott (R)
! style="width:100px;"| BillLee (LU)
! Undecided
|-
| SurveyMonkey
| align=center| November 1–7, 2016
| align=center| 454
| align=center| ± 4.6%
|  align=center| 51%
| align=center| 47%
| align=center| —
| align=center| 2%
|-
| SurveyMonkey
| align=center| October 31–November 6, 2016
| align=center| 447
| align=center| ± 4.6%
|  align=center| 50%
| align=center| 48%
| align=center| —
| align=center| 2%
|-
| SurveyMonkey
| align=center| October 28–November 3, 2016
| align=center| 449
| align=center| ± 4.6%
| align=center| 46%
|  align=center| 51%
| align=center| —
| align=center| 3%
|-
| SurveyMonkey
| align=center| October 27–November 2, 2016
| align=center| 424
| align=center| ± 4.6%
| align=center| 44%
|  align=center| 53%
| align=center| —
| align=center| 3%
|-
| SurveyMonkey
| align=center| October 26–November 1, 2016
| align=center| 428
| align=center| ± 4.6%
| align=center| 43%
|  align=center| 54%
| align=center| —
| align=center| 3%
|-
| SurveyMonkey
| align=center| October 25–31, 2016
| align=center| 436
| align=center| ± 4.6%
| align=center| 45%
|  align=center| 52%
| align=center| —
| align=center| 3%
|-
| RRH Elections
| align=center| October 24–26, 2016
| align=center| 1,052
| align=center| ± 3.0%
| align=center| 38%
|  align=center| 45%
| align=center| 4%
| align=center| 13%
|-
| Braun Research/WCAX
| align=center| October 19–22, 2016
| align=center| 603
| align=center| ± 4.0%
| align=center| 40%
|  align=center| 47%
| align=center| 6%
| align=center| 9%
|-
| 
| align=center| September 29–October 14, 2016
| align=center| 579
| align=center| ± 3.9%
| align=center| 38%
|  align=center| 39%
| align=center| 7%
| align=center| 14%

Results

References

External links
Live results from the Vermont Secretary of State

Official candidate websites
Sue Minter (D) for Governor
Phil Scott (R) for Governor

Vermont
gubernatorial
2016